FC Dila Gori is a Georgian football club based in Gori. The club takes part in Erovnuli Liga, the first tier of Georgian football system, and plays their home games at Tengiz Burjanadze Stadium.

Dila won the Georgian Cup in 2012 and Georgian Championship in 2015.

History

In the Soviet leagues
Founded in 1949, the club was named after poem "Dila" (literally - morning) written by Joseph Stalin, who was born in the city and spent his youth there.

Until 1961 they played under the name Dinamo Gori in Group A of Georgian republican championship. Following the second place in 1965, the next year Dila took part in the Soviet third league and despite an unbeaten run at home finished 11th among 20 clubs in zone 4, Group B.

In 1969 Dila won the competition among the Caucasian teams. The club played several seasons in zone 4 of the Soviet Second League and after 1979 moved to zone 9 where Transcaucasia was represented. In 1967, 1974 and 1986 Dila reached the 3rd place which was their best result in the Soviet third division.

In Georgian leagues
In 1990 Georgia formed an independent league, which included all clubs from the first three Soviet football divisions. Before 2000 Dila were an average team sitting in mid-table, but in the second decade their performance deteriorated. Although most of the seasons Dila participated in the top league, twice they were relegated to Liga 2 and once to Liga 3.
 
In 2010 the rise started with Dila gaining two consecutive promotions within two years. In 2012 the club clinched their first title after winning the Georgian Cup and during the next five seasons four times represented Georgia in qualifying rounds of UEFA club competitions, including the Champions League. Also, twice in a row Dila participated in Europa League play-offs. During this period they were reinforced by national team members Nukri Revishvili, Giorgi Navalovski, Otar Martsvaladze and Mate Vatsadze.

The club achieved their biggest success in the 2014/15 season under 25-year-old head coach Ucha Sosiashvili. Dila, whose squad included experienced players Aleksandre Kvakhadze, Irakli Modebadze and Nika Kvekveskiri, entered the title race in an early stage and concluded the season with six points clear from their two immediate rivals.

Facing some financial difficulties, FC Dila as a municipal property was sold at a public auction the next year. As a result, Israeli business group Starsportinvest took charge of the club in October 2016.

For three consecutive seasons starting from 2020 Dila emerged victorious from long tight contests over the league bronze medals.

Seasons
{| class="wikitable"
|- bgcolor="#efefef"
! Season
! League
! Pos.
! Pl.
! W
! D
! L
! GF
! GA
! P
! Cup
! Europe
! Notes
! Manager
|-
|1990
|Umaglesi Liga
|align=right|10
|align=right|34||align=right|12||align=right|6||align=right|16
|align=right|52||align=right|58||align=right|42
|rowspan=2| Round of 8
|
|
|
|-
|1991
|Umaglesi Liga
|align=right|11
|align=right|19||align=right|7||align=right|3||align=right|9
|align=right|29||align=right|32||align=right|24
| 
|
|
|-
|1991–92
|Umaglesi Liga
|align=right|10
|align=right|38||align=right|14||align=right|8||align=right|16
|align=right|64||align=right|64||align=right|50
| Round of 16
|
|
|
|-
|1992–93
|Umaglesi Liga
|align=right|13
|align=right|32||align=right|11||align=right|5||align=right|16
|align=right|39||align=right|49||align=right|38
| Round of 8
|
|
|
|-
|1993–94
|Umaglesi Liga
|align=right|9
|align=right|18 ||align=right|4 ||align=right|2 ||align=right|12
|align=right|12 ||align=right|35 ||align=right|14
| Round of 8
|
|
|
|-
|1994–95
|Umaglesi Liga
|align=right|8
|align=right|30||align=right|10||align=right|7||align=right|13
|align=right|25||align=right|35||align=right|37
| Round of 8
|
|
|
|-
|1995–96
|Umaglesi Liga
|align=right|8
|align=right|30 ||align=right|12 ||align=right|4 ||align=right|14
|align=right|53 ||align=right|55 ||align=right|40
|Quarter-finals
|
|
|
|-
|1996–97
|Umaglesi Liga
|align=right|8
|align=right|30 ||align=right|10 ||align=right|7 ||align=right|13
|align=right|30 ||align=right|39 ||align=right|37
| 
|
|
|
|-
|1997–98
|Umaglesi Liga
|align=right|9
|align=right|30||align=right|11||align=right|4||align=right|15
|align=right|31||align=right|36||align=right|37
|bgcolor=cc9966|Semi-finals
|
|
|
|-
|1998–99
|Umaglesi Liga
|align=right|10
|align=right|30||align=right|10||align=right|5||align=right|15
|align=right|37||align=right|54||align=right|35
| Round of 8
|
|
|
|-
|1999–00
|Umaglesi Liga
|align=right|8
|align=right|14||align=right|2||align=right|0||align=right|12
|align=right|9||align=right|38||align=right|6
|Quarter-finals
|
|
|
|-
|2000–01
|Umaglesi Liga
|align=right|10
|align=right|10||align=right|5||align=right|1||align=right|4
|align=right|19||align=right|11||align=right|16
|Quarter-finals
|
|relegation play-off, Relegated
|
|-
|2001–02
|bgcolor=#ffa07a|Pirveli Liga
|align=right bgcolor=silver|2
|align=right|10 ||align=right|6 ||align=right|1 ||align=right|3
|align=right|19 ||align=right|13 ||align=right|19
| Round of 8
|
|Promoted
|
|-
|2002–03
|Umaglesi Liga
|align=right|7
|align=right|10 ||align=right|5 ||align=right|3 ||align=right|2
|align=right|15 ||align=right|8 ||align=right|18
| Quarter-finals
|
|
|
|-
|2003–04
|Umaglesi Liga
|align=right|6
|align=right|22 ||align=right|10 ||align=right|4 ||align=right|8
|align=right|28 ||align=right|20 ||align=right|34
|bgcolor=cc9966|Semi-finals
|Inter-Toto Cup
|
|
|-
|2004–05
|Umaglesi Liga
|align=right|10
|align=right|36 ||align=right|2 ||align=right|4 ||align=right|30
|align=right|20 ||align=right|88 ||align=right|10
| Round of 8
|
|
|
|-
|2005–06
|Umaglesi Liga
|align=right|11
|align=right|30 ||align=right|9 ||align=right|4 ||align=right|17
|align=right|35 ||align=right|44 ||align=right|31
| Round of 16
|
|
|
|-
|2006–07
|Umaglesi Liga
|align=right|13
|align=right|26 ||align=right|3 ||align=right|6 ||align=right|17
|align=right|21 ||align=right|56 ||align=right|15
| Round of 16
|
|
|
|-
|2007–08
|Umaglesi Liga
|align=right|14
|align=right|26 ||align=right|1 ||align=right|5 ||align=right|20
|align=right|12 ||align=right|53 ||align=right|8
| Quarter-finals
|
|Relegated
|
|-
|2008–09
|bgcolor=#ffa07a|Pirveli Liga East
|align=right|5
|align=right|30 ||align=right|12 ||align=right|9 ||align=right|9
|align=right|48 ||align=right|31 ||align=right|45
| Not Played
|
|Relegated
|
|-
|2009–10
|bgcolor=#98bb98|Meore Liga East
|align=right bgcolor=gold|1
|align=right| ||align=right| ||align=right| ||align=right|
|align=right| ||align=right| ||align=right|
| Not Played
|
|Promoted
|Gia Tsetsadze
|-
|2010–11
|bgcolor=#ffa07a|Pirveli Liga
|align=right bgcolor=cc9966|3
|align=right|32 ||align=right|20 ||align=right|9 ||align=right|3
|align=right|58 ||align=right|21 ||align=right|69
|Round of 16
|
|promotion play-off, Promoted
|Gia Tsetsadze
|-
|2011–12
|Umaglesi Liga
|align=right|5
|align=right|28 ||align=right|10 ||align=right|7 ||align=right|11
|align=right|38 ||align=right|32 ||align=right|37
|bgcolor=gold|Winner
|
|
|Gia TsetsadzeTeimuraz Makharadze
|-
|2012–13
|Umaglesi Liga
|align=right bgcolor=silver|2
|align=right|32 ||align=right|22 ||align=right|2 ||align=right|8
|align=right|60 ||align=right|26 ||align=right|48
|Quarter-finals
|UEFA Europa League Play-off
|
|Temur ShalamberidzeGiorgi DaraseliaValdas Ivanauskas
|-
|2013–14
|Umaglesi Liga
|align=right|9
|align=right|32 ||align=right|11 ||align=right|8 ||align=right|13
|align=right|44 ||align=right|36 ||align=right|41
|bgcolor=cc9966|Semi-finals
|UEFA Europa League Play-off
|
|Giorgi Devdariani
|-
|2014–15
|Umaglesi Liga
|align=right bgcolor=gold|1
|align=right|30 ||align=right|19 ||align=right|7 ||align=right|4
|align=right|50 ||align=right|21 ||align=right|64
|Quarter-finals
|
|
|Ucha Sosiashvili
|-
|2015–16
|Umaglesi Liga
|align=right bgcolor=cc9966|3
|align=right|30 ||align=right|19 ||align=right|5 ||align=right|6
|align=right|51 ||align=right|25 ||align=right|62
|Second Round
|UEFA Champions League 2Q
|
|Ucha Sosiashvili
|-
|2016
|Umaglesi Liga
|align=right|5
|align=right|12 ||align=right|5 ||align=right|2 ||align=right|5
|align=right|13 ||align=right|12 ||align=right|17
|Second Round
|UEFA Europa League 1Q
|relegation play-off, Won
|Ucha Sosiashvili
|-
|2017
|Erovnuli Liga
|align=right|7
|align=right|36 ||align=right|11 ||align=right|8 ||align=right|17
|align=right|41 ||align=right|51 ||align=right|41
|Quarter-finals
|
|
|Ziv Avraham Arie, Giorgi Dekanosidze, Giorgi Daraselia
|-
|2018
|Erovnuli Liga
|align=right|5
|align=right|36 ||align=right|17 ||align=right|12 ||align=right|7
|align=right|60 ||align=right|40 ||align=right|63
|Round of 16
|
|
|Giorgi Daraselia, Ramaz Sogolashvili 
|-
|2019
|Erovnuli Liga
|align=right|7
|align=right|36 ||align=right|11 ||align=right|10 ||align=right|15
|align=right|40 ||align=right|44 ||align=right|43
|Round of 16
|
|
|Giorgi Dekanosidze, Georgi Nemsadze
|-
|2020
|Erovnuli Liga
|align=right bgcolor=cc9966|3
|align=right|18 ||align=right|8 ||align=right|6 ||align=right|4
|align=right|29 ||align=right|17 ||align=right|30
|Quarter-finals
|
|
|Georgi Nemsadze
|-
|-
|2021
|Erovnuli Liga
|align=right bgcolor=cc9966|3
|align=right|36 ||align=right|17 ||align=right|10 ||align=right|9
|align=right|48 ||align=right|35 ||align=right|61
|Round of 16
|UEFA UCL 1Q
|
|Andriy Demchenko
|-
|-
|2022
|Erovnuli Liga
|align=right bgcolor=cc9966|3
|align=right|36 ||align=right|17 ||align=right|8 ||align=right|11
|align=right|48 ||align=right|35 ||align=right|59
|Quarter-finals
|UEFA UCL 1Q
|
|Andriy Demchenko
|-
|}

European competitions
Dila Gori debuted in UEFA competitions in 2004. Although the club did not obtain an Intertoto Cup slot based on their league position, they replaced a higher placed team, which abstained from the participation. After being held to a goalless draw at home, Marek Dupnitsa beat Dila in the return leg. Later the next decade there were three more cases when the Georgian side achieved relatively better results in away games than back home.

As the Cup winners, the team reached Europe League play-offs in 2012. During this campaign Dila eliminated two opponents, including Anorthosis Famagusta, which was further subjected to UEFA sanctions for crowd disturbances occurred during their home game.

The next year Dila similarly prevailed in two rounds of the competition before their road to the group stage was blocked by Rapid Vienna. The team's performance against Igor Tudor's Hajduk Split was widely hailed this season.

In next cases the club wrapped up their European seasons after the first round.

Notes
 1Q: First qualifying round
 2Q: Second qualifying round
 3Q: Third qualifying round
 PO: Play-off round

Stadium

The club play their home matches at the Tengiz Burjanadze Stadium, a 5,000 seater football stadium situated in Gori.

Crest and colours 
The club's colors are Red and light blue.

Shirt sponsors and kit manufacturers

Current squad

Honours 
Erovnuli Liga
Champions: 2014–15
Runners-up: 2012-13
Bronze medals: 2015-16, 2020, 2021, 2022

Georgian Cup
Winners: 2011–12

Managers 

  Gia Tsetsadze (Feb 1, 2010 – Oct 27, 2011)
  Temur Makharadze (Nov 15 2011–Mar 26 2012)
  Temur Shalamberidze (March 27–Sept 8 2012)
  Giorgi Daraselia (July 1, 2012 – Dec 31, 2012)
  Valdas Ivanauskas (January 23 – May 31, 2013)
  Giorgi Devdariani (June 1, 2013 – Oct 17, 2013)
 Ramaz Sogolashvili (17 Oct 2013–29 May 2014)
  Ucha Sosiashvili (30 May 2014 – 11 Jan 2017)
  Ziv Avraham Arie (16 Jan 2017 – 2 June 2017)
  Giorgi Dekanosidze (June - July 2017)
  Giorgi Daraselia (July 2017 - August 2018)
  Ramaz Sogolashvili (August - December 2018)
  Giorgi Dekanosidze (Jan - Jul 2019)
  Georgi Nemsadze (Aug 2019 - Dec 2020)
  Andriy Demchenko (since December 2020)

Top Goalscorers

References

External links

 
 
 Soccerway
 wildstat.com

 
Dila Gori
Association football clubs established in 1949
1949 establishments in Georgia (country)